Denis Collins (born January 12, 1956) was an American business ethicist and tenured professor of business at Edgewood College in Madison, Wisconsin.

Biography
Denis Collins was born in the Bronx and raised in Carlstadt, New Jersey. He received a B.S. in business administration from Montclair State University in 1977, an M.A. in philosophy from Bowling Green State University in 1987, and a PhD in business environment and public policy from the University of Pittsburgh in 1990. He specialized in business ethics, teaching it at the University of Wisconsin–Madison, the University of Bridgeport, and Edgewood College.

He is a terminal cancer survivor, husband and father.

Optimal Ethics System Model
Collins' Optimal Ethics System Model is a compilation of what he says are best practices for achieving a morally healthy organization (preventing unethical or illegal behavior). They typically take the form of step-by-step instructions, like recipes. Collins offers empirical evidence that sustained financial success requires implementation of this model.

The Optimal Ethics System Model offers best practices in five categories:
 Hiring practices
 Procedures for recruiting individuals who demonstrate and sustain ethical behavior over time
 Orientation practices
 Procedures for orienting new employees to a code of ethics and conduct
 Procedures for orienting new employees to an ethical decision-making framework
 Training practices
 Procedures for teaching ethics
 Operating practices
 Procedures for nurturing respect for employee and customer diversity
 Systems for reporting ethical misbehavior
 Procedures for ethical leadership and management (rewarding ethical behavior)
 Procedures for engaging and empowering employees to achieve superior performance
 Procedures for managing interaction with the natural environment
 Procedures for conducting meaningful community outreach
 Evaluation practices
 Procedures for continually improving best practices

Books
Collins has authored or edited articles and essays on business ethics, social responsibility, participatory management, and service learning; he has also authored, co-authored, and co-edited several books:
 Business Ethics: How to Design and Manage Ethical Organizations
 Essentials of Business Ethics: Creating an Organization of High Integrity and Superior Performance
 Behaving Badly: Ethical Lessons from Enron
 Gainsharing and Power: Lessons from Six Scanlon Plans
 Sustaining the Natural Environment: Empirical Studies on the Interface Between Nature and Organizations
 Ethical Dilemmas in Business

Board service
 Encyclopedia of Business Ethics and Society, 2004–2007
 Journal of Business Ethics, 2003–
 Journal of Academic Ethics, 2002–
 Organization & Environment, 1996–1999
 International Association for Business and Society, 1995
 Social Issues in Management Division, Academy of Management, 1995–1998

Awards
 2011 Samuel Mazzuchelli Medallion for cultivating intellectual and spiritual resources to empower others, Edgewood College
 2010 MBA Outstanding Faculty Award, Edgewood College
 2009 Estervig-Beaubien Outstanding Professor Award, Edgewood College
 Three times voted the outstanding MBA faculty member at the University of Wisconsin–Madison in BusinessWeek's survey of alumni
 Finalist for the Academy of Management Distinguished Educator Award

References

External links
 Collins’ faculty webpage
 Collins’ Business Ethics: How to Design and Manage Ethical Organizations webpage
 Collins’ Essentials of Business Ethics: Creating an Organization of High Integrity and Superior Performance webpage

American philosophy academics
1956 births
Living people